Xirivella is a municipality in the Valencian Community, Spain. It borders the city of Valencia, Alaquàs, Picanya and Mislata. The municipality is divided by the V-30 motorway and the river Turia, with the La Luz district on the eastern part of the river. Since June 2012, a bridge across the motorway has connected both parts. Local issues include noise pollution, caused by the nearby Valencia Airport

Transport
It is connected to central Valencia by bus routes and a railway station. Metro links exist in the nearby town of Mislata. The proposed Line 14 of Metrovalencia is due to link the town to the rest of the metro network after 2030.

Toponymy
The name Xirivella may come from the Latin word Silvella (little forest).

History
Archeological remains have been found in Xirivella dating since Roman times.

During the Middle Ages the area was inhabited by farmers that cultivated the land. The silk industry also developed during this period.

Xirivella had a population of 29,409 inhabitants in 2014.

Sister cities
Xirivella has town twinned with Casas de Benítez in Cuenca province (Spain), the Dunavarsány city of Hungary and the city of Habana Vieja in Cuba.

Cultural heritage

Xirivella has an interesting cultural heritage.

The old city maintains the urbanism from the Arabic era. This is a list of the main historical buildings:

- Virgen de la Salud Church (Església de la Verge de la Salut): The only parish until 1953. It was built at the end of the 17th century.

- Virgen de la Salud Chapel (Ermita de la Verge de la Salut)

- La Closa: 14th century building.  It was restored in 2003.

- Dau House: 14th century building. It was the place where taxes could be paid.

- Tithe House (Casa del Delme): 14th century house, but it was demolished around 2000.

- Alquería del Castillo (Alqueria del Castell): It has also been demolished. It was located on the site of a Roman villa.

Cultural life

Xirivella has a very active cultural life. There are several cultural associations that include the wind orchestra (banda) called CIM Xirivella, the choir (Escola Coral Andarella), the International Clowns Festival (Mostra Internacional de Pallassos), the music school, the Culture House where are held concerts, shows, exhibitions, and a theater. Xirivella also organize the Xirivella Award, a recognition to honor its outstanding citizens.

Local politics
The municipality had been governed by the Spanish Socialist Workers Party since the 1970s, either alone or with the support of United Left. However at the 2011 local elections, the People's Party won a majority of seats for the first time.

Summary of council election results

Source:

References

Municipalities in the Province of Valencia
Horta Oest